Kettle Cove is a bay in Dukes County, Massachusetts.

References

Bodies of water of Dukes County, Massachusetts
Sounds of Massachusetts